Tika Ram Shrestha (born 2 September 1964 in Kathmandu) is a Nepalese sport shooter. He has been selected to compete for Nepal in air rifle shooting at the 2004 Summer Olympics, finishing in the penultimate position out of 47 shooters.

Shrestha qualified as a sole shooter for the Nepalese team in the men's 10 m air rifle at the 2004 Summer Olympics in Athens. He had been granted an Olympic invitation for his country by ISSF and IOC, having registered a minimum qualifying score of 570 at the ISSF World Cup meet in Bangkok, Thailand few months earlier. A less experienced to the international scene, Shrestha showed much of his strength to shoot 579 points out of a possible 600 for the penultimate position in a 47-shooter field, failing to advance further to the final.

References

External links

External links
 

1964 births
Living people
Nepalese male sport shooters
Olympic shooters of Nepal
Shooters at the 2004 Summer Olympics
Sportspeople from Kathmandu
Shooters at the 2002 Asian Games
Asian Games competitors for Nepal